Anthony Michael Ackroyd (born 30 June) is an Australian comedian, writer, musician, actor, speaker, and teacher. He is currently the CEO (Chief Enjoyment Officer) of his company The Laughter Advantage.

Biography
Ackroyd was born in Hobart, Tasmania and grew up in the suburb of Warrane. He graduated from the University of Tasmania with a Bachelor of Arts, majoring in English Literature, European Literature and Philosophy.

Ackroyd began performing stand-up comedy at the Sydney Comedy Store in the 1980s. Television exposure followed with appearances on popular TV shows such as The Video Comedy Store, Hey Hey It's Saturday and The Midday Show. From 1989 to 1991 he was a cast member on ABC TV's pioneering live comedy show The Big Gig. During the 1990s he appeared on TV shows including Good News Week, Tonight Live, Mornings with Kerri-Anne, and Pizza. He performed the critically acclaimed comedy monologue "Karma Comedian" on ABC's The Smallest Room in the House, which detailed with great honesty many aspects of his life to that point. Between 1996-2021 he was a cast member of the ABC current events comedy show Thank God It's Friday!''' 

Ackroyd performed for many years as a clown doctor at the Sydney Children's Hospital as well as working as a humour therapist in aged care facilities. He currently teaches the healing the power of laughter and humour to people with PTSD, trauma issues, serious and chronic illnesses at the Quest For Life Centre in the Southern Highlands of NSW. 

Ackroyd's one man shows have included Anthony Ackroyd in His Own Little World, Ecstasy and How To Get It, At Last The Truth About Everything, and The Fruit of My Lions.

He has written for TV and film including the sketch show The Comedy Company and two years writing for an internet sitcom spin off for Jim Carrey's Ace Ventura character. He has workshopped material with writer-performers such as Billy Crystal and Rowan Atkinson. Ackroyd's articles have appeared in the Sydney Morning Herald, The Age, Vogue, Life Etc., Studio, Eco Magazine, Parenting, Men's Stuff, the Good Weekend and Good Taste. He has held the position of senior writer at Granada ITV. For 3 years he was the director of the Bowral Of Laughs Comedy Festival held in Bowral, NSW.

Ackroyd's film work includes roles in the movies Reckless Kelly, Gino, and WillFull. He provided the voice of Dragon on the children's TV show Magic Mountain.

Ackroyd became a frequent impersonator of former Australian Prime Minister Kevin Rudd, and hosted his own show Political Bent''.

At the 2014 by-election for the seat of Griffith, brought about following the retirement of Kevin Rudd from the Australian House of Representatives, Ackroyd contested the poll representing the Bullet Train party. He was also a candidate at the 2016 federal election for the seat of Wentworth, representing the Arts Party.

Ackroyd is a senior tutor teaching the Advanced Diploma comedy and improvisation courses at Screenwise Acting School in Sydney. He presents his keynote and workshop Stress Less Laugh More to businesses, universities and at public events. 

Ackroyd created his company The Laughter Advantage which delivers information, inspiration, courses and events that help people learn how to leverage the power of humour, laughter, fun, play and positive energy so they can lead lives full of happiness, energy and success.

Personal life

He is an Ambassador for the Sydney Swans.

References

External links
 Anthony Ackroyd website
 The Laughter Advantage

1958 births
Living people
People from Hobart
Australian male comedians
University of Tasmania alumni